Trocaz pigeon described by Karl Heineken
 Death of  Juan Ignacio Molina
 Death of Jean-Baptiste Lamarck
 Auguste Drapiez publishes  Résumé d'ornithologie ou d'histoire naturelle des oiseaux 
 Johann Georg Wagler  writes descriptions of new bird species in Isis, oder Encyclopädische Zeitung  published by Lorenz Oken Some are: the russet-throated puffbird, the golden-fronted woodpecker, the pinnated bittern, the chestnut-colored woodpecker, the brown jay, the intermediate egret and the ladder-backed woodpecker
 George Ord retires from business to devote his time to ornithology.
 1829-33 Admiral Sir Edward Belcher  "Aetna " survey expedition to North and West Africa.
 Julien François Desjardins, Charles Telfair, Wenceslas Bojer, and Jacques Delisse, take part in founding the Société d'Histoire Naturelle de l'Île Maurice

Birding and ornithology by year
1829 in science